Tern island is an island a few hundred metres north of Tern Cliffs and the Apudthama National Park in the Great Barrier Reef Marine Park Queensland, Australia, in the Cape York Peninsula about 40 km southeast of Bamaga.

References

Islands on the Great Barrier Reef